Stenalia graeca is a beetle in the genus Stenalia of the family Mordellidae. It was described in 1965 by Ermisch.

References

graeca
Beetles described in 1965